Flavio Caballero is a Venezuelann actor. He is a native of Cartagena.

Biography
Flavio Caballero grew up with two childhood dreams: he wanted to become both a psychologist and an actor. When he was in high school, he became more interested in psychology, and he was an above average student, becoming able to attend college, where he pursued a career as a psychologist.

Eventually, he began losing interest in that career, focusing instead on becoming an actor. Caballero began to study acting at the Instituto de Arte Dramatico Juana Sujo.

Caballero established himself in Caracas, Venezuela, where he kept studying acting, at the Instituto Nacional de Teatro de Caracas. He also studied acting in the United States and Brazil.

In 1971, Caballero made his film debut, acting in an Italian-Spaniard-French production, Il Corsaro Nero ("Black Pirate"). Caballero proceeded to act in more than seven theatre plays, and, in 1979, he appeared on Venezuelan screens for the first time, in a film named El Rebaño de los Angeles ("Angel's Herd"). In 1982, Flavio made his telenovela debut, acting in La Señorita Perdomo ("Ms. Perdomo"). That soap opera was the first of seventeen soap operas produced by Radio Caracas Television that Caballero would participate in, including 1983's Leonela, 1987's La Intrusa ("The Intruder") and Mi Amada Beatriz ("My Beloved Beatriz"), 1988's Aventurera ("Adventurer"), and 2002's Mi Gorda Bella ("My Beautiful Fat Girl").

Perhaps Caballero's most important career year was 1989, when he reached international fame starring in Amanda Sabater alongside Maricarmen Regueiro. Caballero played Ivan Moros in the soap opera. Amanda Sabater was an heiress whose father was Diego Sabater. However, and unknown to the two main characters in the soap opera, Diego was really Ivan's father and not Amanda's. This soap opera reached high ratings in many countries, including Mexico, Puerto Rico and (among Hispanics) in the United States.

Caballero is currently under contract with RCN Television of Colombia.

Filmography
1988: Señora as Anselmo
1989: Amanda Sabater as Ivan Moros 
1991: El Desprecio as Raúl Velandró
2001: La niña de mis ojos as Cristobal
2002: Mi gorda bella as Juan Angel
2004: Estrambotica Anastasia as Aquiles
2006: La Viuda de Blanco as Justino Brinión 
2008: El Rostro de Analia as Nelson Lares
2008: Valeria as Alfredo
2011: El Joe La Leyenda as Anibal Ramon

External links
 Telemundo Website
  Official "El Rostro de Analía" Website
vencor.co page
 
rctv.net page, in Spanish 

Colombian male actors
Living people
RCTV personalities
Year of birth missing (living people)